The Vietnam Internet Network Information Center (VNNIC) is the National Internet Registry in Vietnam that manages several aspects of Internet operations, including the allocation of IP addresses and AS numbers. VNNIC is the administrative agency responsible for Internet affairs under the Ministry of Information and Communications (Vietnam).

Historically, VNPT managed the .vn top-level domain; in 2001 the management of the .vn domain was transferred to the VNNIC.

External links
 VNNIC website

Internet in Vietnam
Government agencies of Vietnam